The Greek Handball Cup is the second more important competition of Greek handball. The Cup is organised by the Hellenic Handball Federation (Greek: ΟΧΕ). The first Cup took place in 1982–83 season. The most successful team of the competition is Filippos Veria who have won six cups. The last cup has been won by AESH Pylaia.

Previous winners

 1983 :  V.A.O.
 1984 :  V.A.O. (2)
 1985 :  Filippos Veria
 1986 :  Ionikos Nea Filadelfeia 
 1987 :  Ionikos Nea Filadelfeia (2)
 1988 :  Ionikos Nea Filadelfeia (3)
 1989 :  Ionikos Nea Filadelfeia (4)
 1990 :  Archelaos Katerinis
 1991 :  Filippos Veria (2)
 1992 :  Filippos Veria (3)
 1993 :  Ionikos Nea Filadelfeia (5)
 1994 :  Archelaos Katerinis (2)
 1995 :  AS Xini
 1996 :  ESN Vrilissia 
 1997 :  Athinaikos 
 1998 :  ASE Douka 
 1999 :  ASE Douka (2)
 2000 :  Panellinios 
 2001 :  Panellinios (2)
 2002 :  Panellinios (3)
 2003 :  Filippos Veria (4)
 2004 :  GAS Kilkis 
 2005 :  Athinaikos (2)
 2006 :  Athinaikos (3)
 2007 :  Filippos Veria (5)
 2008 :  ASE Douka (3)
 2009 :  AEK
 2010 :  ASE Douka (4)
 2011 :  ESN Vrilissia (2)
 2012 :  PAOK
 2013 :  AEK (2)
 2014 :  AEK (3)
 2015 :  PAOK (2)
 2016 :  Filippos Veria (6)
 2017 :  PAOK (3)
 2018 :  Olympiacos
 2019 :  Olympiacos (2)
 2021 :  AEK (4)
 2022 :  AESH Pylaia

Finals

Notes

Performances

By club

AEK and Diomidis Argous both qualified to the 2020 Greek Cup Final which was eventually cancelled due to COVID-19 pandemic.

By city
Thirteen clubs from six cities have won the cup.

References

External links

Cup Mens
Handball Cup